Classical may refer to:

European antiquity
Classical antiquity, a period of history from roughly the 7th or 8th century B.C.E. to the 5th century C.E. centered on the Mediterranean Sea
Classical architecture, architecture derived from Greek and Roman architecture of classical antiquity
Classical mythology, the body of myths from the ancient Greeks and Romans
Classical tradition, the reception of classical Greco-Roman antiquity by later cultures
Classics, study of the language and culture of classical antiquity, particularly its literature
Classicism, a high regard for classical antiquity in the arts

Music and arts
Classical ballet, the most formal of the ballet styles
Classical music, a variety of Western musical styles from the 9th century to the present
Classical guitar, a common type of acoustic guitar
Classical Hollywood cinema, a visual and sound style in the American film industry between 1927 and 1963
Classical Indian dance, various codified art forms whose theory can be traced back to 400 BC
Classical period (music), a period of increased interest in classicism from 1750 to 1825
Classical unities, rules for drama derived from a passage in Aristotle's Poetics
Classical (album), a 1997 album by Wolf Hoffmann
A Classical, a 2013 album by Ayumi Hamasaki

Language
Classical language, any language with a literature that is considered classical
Classical Arabic, the Arabic language in which the Qur'an is written
Classical Armenian, the oldest attested form of the Armenian language
Classical Chinese, the language of the classic literature from the end of the Spring and Autumn period
Classical French, the French language as systematised in the 17th and 18th centuries
Classical Latin, the Latin language used by the ancient Romans
Classical Nahuatl, the language spoken by Aztec nobles in the Valley of Mexico at the time of the 16th-century Spanish conquest

Science and mathematics
Classical economics, school of economics developed in the late 18th and early 19th century
Classical logic, a class of formal logics that have been most intensively studied and most widely used
Classical mathematics, mathematics constructed and proved on the basis of classical logic and set theory
Classical mechanics, the set of physical laws describing the motion of bodies under the action of a system of forces
Classical physics, the study of physics before the general theory of relativity and quantum mechanics

Other uses
Classical liberalism, a political philosophy and ideology belonging to liberalism
Classical conditioning, a kind of learning that occurs when a conditioned stimulus is paired with an unconditioned stimulus
Classical time control, a category of time control used in chess
The Classical, a defunct American sports website

See also
Classic, an outstanding example of a particular style, something of lasting worth or with a timeless quality
List of classical music styles, styles of music considered classical
Classic (disambiguation)
Classical period (disambiguation)
Classics (disambiguation)